is a passenger railway station located in the city of Ono, Hyōgo Prefecture, Japan, operated by the private Kobe Electric Railway (Shintetsu).

Lines

Station layout
The station consists of tow unnumbered ground-level side platforms connected by a level crossing. The station is unattended.

Platforms

Adjacent stations

History
Kashiyama Station opened on December 28, 1951.

Passenger statistics
In fiscal 2019, the station was used by an average of 290 passengers daily.

Surrounding area
 Ono Takumidai Industrial Park.

See also
List of railway stations in Japan

References

External links

 Official website (Kobe Electric Railway) 

Railway stations in Japan opened in 1951
Railway stations in Hyōgo Prefecture
Ono, Hyōgo